Mohamed Awad (born 6 July 1992) is an Egyptian footballer who plays for Egyptian Premier League club Zamalek and the Egypt national football team as a goalkeeper.

The Start
Started with the Ismaily S.C youth team, Saafan Al-Saghir became his goalkeeper coach since he was in the youth team until he reached the first team. He played his first game in the Egyptian Premier League on 25 December 2013 in front of the El Qanah FC, and the match ended with a 2-1 win over Ismaily SC.

With clubs

Al-Masry
On December 3, 2014 Ismaily SC officially rejected the Al-Masry request for the loan until the end of the season. The Brazilian coach refused to sell the goalkeeper and refused Awad to leave the club in any case. However, Awad did not participate in any official match since the beginning of the season, Awad wanted to leave the team for a loan, and the team agreed to let Awad go out for a loan to Al-Masry to be able to participate in the official games, to return to the lineups Ismaily SC beginning from the following season, and then loaned Mohamed Awad out for Al-Masry for 6 months starting from Winter transfer period for 600 thousand pounds until the end of the season. Awad participated in 22 matches in which he maintained a clean sheet during ten matches.
On 9 March 2015 Ismaily SC officials decided to terminate the loan with the end of the football season and refused to renew the loan contract due to the need of Awad during the following period. There was an agreement between the three, Ismaily SC, Al-Masry and Awad that in January if all parties agree to extend the loan only he will stay, but the Ismaily SC officials announced their decision to reject the loan renewal.

Transfer to the Portuguese league
On Friday evening 12 June 2015, Ismaily SC received a formal fax from C.F. União to sign the player during the summer transfer period and the beginning of the following season, and the management of the club accepted the departure of the player to the outside professional, but Ismaily SC has made a decision to sell the goalkeeper for a million and a half euros to approve the departure of goalkeeper, However, the club's offer was rejected because of the poor money supply.
The Portuguese club made a new bid on June 23, 2016, during the summer transfer period for a million euros, but the Ismaily SC club refused the bid for Awad.

Back to Ismaily SC
After his loan to the Al-Masry, Awad returned to Ismaily SC again, and was the first match after the return was against El-Entag El-Harby SC on 21 October 2015 and he managed to keep the clean sheet, and now Awad participates mainly with Ismaily SC.

Egypt national football team call-up

On 14 November 2017, Mohamed Awad was called up to the Egypt national football team by Héctor Cúper.

In May 2018 he was named in Egypt’s preliminary squad for the 2018 World Cup in Russia.

International
''Statistics accurate as of match played 14 October 2019.

Honours

Zamalek

Egyptian Premier League 2020-21, 2021-22

Egypt Cup: 2018–19 , 2021
Egyptian Super Cup: 2019–20
 CAF Super Cup: 2020

References

1992 births
Living people
Egyptian footballers
Egypt international footballers
Association football goalkeepers
Ismaily SC players
Al-Wehda Club (Mecca) players
Saudi Professional League players
Egyptian Premier League players
Egyptian expatriate sportspeople in Saudi Arabia
Expatriate footballers in Saudi Arabia
People from Ismailia